WPAC may refer to:

 WPAC (FM), an oldies radio station in New York State
 Western Pacific Ocean, an abbreviation for the Western Pacific tropical cyclone basin often used by tropical meteorologists
 Worcester Park Athletic Club, a sporting organization in Worcester, England
 Working People's Art Class, a former school of art in Georgetown, Guyana